Planques is a commune in the Pas-de-Calais department in the Hauts-de-France region of France. The source of the small river Planquette is in the commune.

Population

Places of interest
 The 16th-18th century church

See also
Communes of the Pas-de-Calais department

References

Communes of Pas-de-Calais